The Syrian Interim Government (SIG) is an alternative government in Syria, formed by the umbrella opposition group, the National Coalition for Syrian Revolutionary and Opposition Forces. The interim government indirectly controls some areas of the country and claims to be the sole legitimate government on behalf of the Syrian opposition in defiance of the Council of Ministers of the Syrian Arab Republic. The interim government's headquarters in Syria are located in the city of Azaz in Aleppo Governorate.

History
At a conference held in Istanbul on 19 March 2013, the Syrian National Coalition (SNC) elected Ghassan Hitto as prime minister of a Syrian interim government. Hitto announced that a technical government would be formed led by 10 to 12 ministers, with the minister of defence to be chosen by the Free Syrian Army. At first, the SIG was "based in exile and lack[ed] an organizational base inside Syria." It was intended that the new ministries would not be placed in a single location but distributed in regions under the control of the Syrian opposition.

A Christian, a Kurd and a woman were part of the first cabinet; Ahmad Ramadan of the SNC stated that the cabinet was appointed on a meritocratic basis. The Assyrian component of the National Coalition said that they were not given any attention in the selection of the cabinet. Its General Assembly has an administrative function. The first interim cabinet was dissolved in July 2014. A new cabinet was formed in October 2014.

The SIG has been the primary civilian authority throughout most of Syria's opposition-held areas. Its system of administrative local councils operate services such as schools and hospitals in these areas. In December 2015, the SIG founded the Free Aleppo University (FAU), as an alternative to government-run universities; an estimated 7,000 students were enrolled in FAU in early 2018, with campuses in opposition-held territory across five provinces. In January 2018, the SIG moved the University's administration from Idlib to the west Aleppo town of Bashqateen. In late September 2016, the Syrian interim government minister for local administration was among a dozen people killed by an ISIL suicide bomber in the southern city of Inkhil.

The interim government was based in Turkey and has received direct funding from the United States. In January 2015, the Syrian interim government received US$6 million from the United States, the first funding of this kind. The funds were to be used for reconstruction efforts and the strengthening of local government in opposition-held parts of Syria such as northern Aleppo and northwestern Idlib, with the interim government planning to expand into northern Latakia and northern Hama in the following months. By August 2017, the Syrian interim government stopped paying salaries to workers, and work within the interim government became voluntary work. As the Turkish occupation of northern Syria grew from 2016, the SIG moved into the Turkish-controlled territories and began to exert partial authority there, including providing documents to Syrian citizens.

By late 2017, the SIG presided over 12 provincial councils and over 400 elected local councils. It held elections across Idlib Governorate in 2017. It also operates a major border crossing between Syria and Turkey, which generates an estimated $1 million revenue each month. In opposition areas outside the Turkish-occupied ones, the SIG has been in conflict with the Islamist Syrian Salvation Government for control since September 2017.

On 30 December 2017, at least 30 factions operating under the banner of the Syrian Interim Government merged in a unified armed group after four months of preparations. Jawad Abu Hatab, the SIG's Prime Minister and Defence Minister, announced the formation of the Syrian National Army (SNA) after meeting with rebel commanders in the town of Azaz. The newly formed body claimed to have 22,000 fighters, many of them trained and equipped by Turkey. The National Front for Liberation is also aligned to the Syrian Interim Government, and eventually became a subgroup of the SNA.

List of presidents

Prime ministers

List of ministers

Population centers
This list includes some of the largest cities and towns under the Syrian Interim Government.

See also
Politics of Syria
Syrian Civil War
Syrian Salvation Government
Foreign relations of the Syrian Opposition
International recognition of the Syrian National Council

References

 
2013 establishments in Syria
National Coalition of Syrian Revolutionary and Opposition Forces
Governments in exile